NGC 575  is a barred spiral galaxy of Hubble type SB(rs)c in the constellation Pisces. It is approximately 145 million light years from the Milky Way and has a diameter of about 70,000 light years.

The object was discovered on October 17, 1876, by Édouard Stephan (listed as NGC 575) and on January 18, 1896, by Stéphane Javelle (listed as IC 1710).

References

External links 
 
 SIMBAD Astronomical Database
 Deep Sky Catalog

Barred spiral galaxies
Pisces (constellation)
575
005634